The Games People Play is the third live album by British blues harmonica player, Paul Lamb and his band The King Snakes to be released on 28 May 2012. This album is a collection of original tracks and blues covers that were recorded whilst touring for his 11th studio album, Mind Games.

Track listing
 "I Got A Woman/Fulsom Prison" (R. Charles, Richard/J. Cash)
 "Let Me In" (P. Lamb, R. Lamb)
 "Come To The Conclusion" (R. Lamb, C. Strentz)
 "Summertime" (Gerhswin, Heyward)
 "Depressing Recession" (C. Strentz)
 "Easy" (W. Horton)
 "Black Jack Game" (R. Charles)
 "Games People Play" (South)
 "Ida Mae" (R. Sykes)
 "Mind Games" (P. Lamb, R. Lamb, C. Strentz, R. Demick, M. Thorne)
 "Ya Ya Blues" (L. Dorsey, C. Lewis)
 "Midnight Special" (Traditional)

Personnel
Paul Lamb - Harmonica and vocals
Chad Strentz - Vocals and rhythm guitar
Ryan Lamb - Lead guitar and backing vocals
Rod Demick - Bass guitar and backing vocals
Dino Coccia - Drums and backing vocals

External links
Secret Records

2012 live albums
Paul Lamb (musician) albums
Secret Records live albums